Wreath Valley is an ice-free valley between Lazzara Ledge and Conway Peak in the Apocalypse Peaks of Victoria Land. It is the westernmost in a group of four aligned hanging valleys. So named in 2005 by the Advisory Committee on Antarctic Names from an ice and rock formation on the valley headwall, which is wreathlike in appearance and visible from a great distance.

References

Valleys of Victoria Land